Lo Russo is an Italian surname. Notable people with the surname include:

 The Lo Russo clan, a Neapolitan Camorra clan 
 Salvatore Lo Russo (born 1953), member of the Camorra
 Michele Lo Russo (1947–1983), Italian footballer

See also
 Lorusso

Italian-language surnames